One of the most prestigious conference awards in college athletics, the Big Ten Medal of Honor was first awarded in 1915 to one student-athlete from the graduating class of each university who had “attained the greatest proficiency in athletics and scholastic work.” The 14 institutions of the Big Ten feature over 10,000 student-athletes, more than any other conference, and only 28 of those individuals are recognized each year with the Big Ten Medal of Honor. In the nearly 100 years of the Medal of Honor, just over 1,300 student-athletes have earned this distinction. The medal features the Latin phrase Mens fervida in corpore lacertoso ("a fervent mind in a vigorous body") on one side and the student's name and the phrase For Scholarship and Athletic Prowess on the reverse side.

History
The award was first given in 1915. It was the first award in intercollegiate athletics to demonstrate support of the educational emphasis placed on athletics and honor those who embody the values of the "student athlete". Although originally awarded only to male athletes, since 1982, a female athlete from each institution has also been recognized.

Notable recipients
The Big Ten Medal of Honor has been awarded to numerous decorated athletes who achieved success after college both in athletics and beyond, including:

 NCAA 10-time National Champion Coach John R. Wooden (Purdue)
 NFL quarterbacks and Super Bowl-winners Bob Griese and Drew Brees (Purdue)
 Seven-time NBA All-Star and member of the Basketball Hall of Fame Jerry Lucas (Ohio State)
 NFL safety and the first African-American coach to win a Super Bowl Tony Dungy (Minnesota)
 MLB catcher and three-time World Series champion Joe Girardi (Northwestern)
 College Football Hall of Fame member and football coach Pat Fitzgerald (Northwestern)
 Olympic swimmer and Gold medalist Davis Tarwater (Michigan)
 Former baseball player turned sports agent Casey Close (Michigan)
 Pan American Games Gold medalist gymnast Abie Grossfeld (Illinois)
 Collegiate track and field coach Francis X. Cretzmeyer (Iowa)
 Professional soccer players Joanna Lohman (Penn State), Emily Zurrer (Illinois), Vanessa DiBernardo (Illinois), and Britt Eckerstrom (Penn State)
Nine-time letterman and University of Wisconsin–Madison athletic director credited with rescuing Badger athletics Pat Richter (Wisconsin) 
 Businessman Keith Nosbusch, chairman and CEO of Rockwell Automation Inc. (Wisconsin)
 NASA astronaut Michael S. Hopkins (Illinois)

List of winners

References

Awards established in 1915
Big Ten Conference
1915 establishments in the United States
College conference trophies and awards in the United States
Student athlete awards in the United States